Frank Bissell "Lefty" Killen (November 30, 1870 – December 3, 1939) was a professional baseball player.  He was a left-handed pitcher over parts of ten seasons (1891–1900) with the Milwaukee Brewers, Washington Senators (NL), Pittsburgh Pirates, Boston Beaneaters and Chicago Orphans.  

In 1893, Killen posted a league-best 36 victories against 14 defeats. No left-hander in NL history has won as many games since then. He was the National League wins leader in 1893 and 1896 with Pittsburgh, leading the league in complete games and shutouts in 1896. 

For his career, he compiled a 164–131 record in 321 appearances, with a 3.78 ERA and 725 strikeouts.

As a hitter, Kileen posted a career .241 batting average (241-for-998) with 11 home runs, 127 RBI, 151 runs scored and drew 131 bases on balls.

He was born and later died in Pittsburgh, Pennsylvania, at the age of 69.

See also

 List of Major League Baseball annual wins leaders

External links

 

1870 births
1939 deaths
Major League Baseball pitchers
Baseball players from Pittsburgh
Milwaukee Brewers (AA) players
Washington Senators (1891–1899) players
Boston Beaneaters players
Pittsburgh Pirates players
Chicago Orphans players
National League wins champions
Minor league baseball managers
Grand Rapids Shamrocks players
Manistee (minor league baseball) players
Minneapolis Millers (baseball) players
Toronto Canucks players
Wheeling Stogies players
Indianapolis Indians players
Atlanta Crackers players